The Alps were an English band from Greenwich, London. They released six singles and one album, with the sixth single 'Obstacle Race' appearing in Spring 2009. The band's debut album, Something I Might Regret, was produced by Dave Allen and released on 10 March 2008.

The Alps operated their own record label 'Elusive Music', were self-managed and oversaw most of their business internally.

The band toured extensively including playing at the Reading Festival in 2005.

In 2009 Heptinstall, Brace and Gray formed the Folk punk band Skinny Lister.

Members 

Daniel Heptinstall (lead vocals, guitar)
Sam 'Mule' Brace (vocals, guitar, keyboard)
David Edwards (Original bass guitar)
Dan 'with a tash' Gray (bass guitar)
Hezi Yechiel (drums)

Discography

Singles

External links 
https://www.bridlingtonfreepress.co.uk/whats-on/the-alps-hit-new-heights-1-1727228

English indie rock groups
Musical groups from the Royal Borough of Greenwich